"Ahead/Replay" is the eighth double A-side single by Vamps, and the first single from album Bloodsuckers released on July 3, 2013. The single came with a DVD that includes the music videos for "Ahead" and "Replay". The single reached number 3 on the Oricon chart.

Track listing

References 

2013 singles
Japanese rock songs
Songs written by Hyde (musician)
2013 songs